Frank W. Wagner (born July 18, 1955) is an American politician. A Republican, he served in the Virginia House of Delegates 1992–2001, and was elected to the Senate of Virginia in a special election on December 19, 2000. He represented the 7th district in Virginia Beach and Norfolk from 2001 until 2019. He was a member of the Commerce and Labor, General Laws and Technology, Rehabilitation and Social Services, and Transportation committees.

Personal life
Wagner was born at a United States Air Force base in England. He graduated from the United States Naval Academy in 1977, with a B.S. degree in Ocean Engineering. He served in the United States Navy as a diving and salvage officer and an engineering duty officer, then went into the boat building and repair business. He  the co-owner/vice president of Davis Boatworks.

Political career
His focus and expertise is on energy policy.

In August 2016, Wagner announced his candidacy for the Republican nomination for governor in 2017. He ran on the slogan "One veteran, one businessman, one Virginian, one choice."

He lost the primary election on June 13, 2017, placing in third behind Corey Stewart and Ed Gillespie, the latter of whom became the Republican nominee.

In March 2019, Wagner announced he would not seek re-election in the 2019 Virginia Senate election. Two months after announcing his retirement, Wagner resigned his Senate seat to accept Governor Ralph Northam's appointment to become Deputy Director of the Virginia Lottery. He was succeeded in the Senate by Republican Jen Kiggans.

Notes

References

External links

Follow the Money - Frank W Wagner
2005 2003 2001 1999 campaign contributions

1955 births
Living people
20th-century American politicians
21st-century American politicians
Businesspeople from Virginia
Candidates in the 2017 United States elections
Republican Party members of the Virginia House of Delegates
People from Ruislip
United States Naval Academy alumni
United States Navy officers
Republican Party Virginia state senators